Cape Verdean Spaniards are residents of Spain whose ancestry originated in Cape Verde.

In 2012, it was estimated that there were 65,000 people of Cape Verdean descent in Spain.

Notable Cape Verdean Spanish people

References

External links 
 Central Intelligence Agency.  "Spain."  The World Factbook.  Retrieved October 19, 2007.

African diaspora in Spain
Cape Verdean diaspora
Ethnic groups in Spain